is a Japanese ice hockey player. She most recently played with the Daishin Ice Hockey Club of the Women's Japan Ice Hockey League (WJIHF) and the Japanese national team during the 2018–19 season.

Ukita competed at both the 2014 and the 2018 Winter Olympics. Additionally, she participated at the IIHF World Women's Championship in 2015, 2016, 2017 (in Division IA), and 2019.

References

External links

1996 births
Living people
Ice hockey players at the 2014 Winter Olympics
Ice hockey players at the 2018 Winter Olympics
Ice hockey players at the 2022 Winter Olympics
Japanese women's ice hockey forwards
Olympic ice hockey players of Japan
Sportspeople from Hokkaido
Asian Games medalists in ice hockey
Asian Games gold medalists for Japan
Ice hockey players at the 2017 Asian Winter Games
Medalists at the 2017 Asian Winter Games